Danger on the Great Lakes is the 173rd volume of the Nancy Drew Mystery Series.

Summary
Nancy's father Carson gives Nancy three tickets for a cruise  between Chicago and Toronto. While shopping, Nancy, Bess and George make a new friend, Amber, who is also going on the Great Lakes cruise. She says that her boyfriend got her a ticket for a lower price since he works on the ship.

When the three are on the ship, Amber is not having any fun since she thinks her boyfriend Craig is neglecting her. Amber asks Nancy to investigate Craig and she finds out that Craig is a detective working on a case. Nancy agrees to help him in hunting down a diamond thief.

References

External links
Danger on the Great Lakes at Fantastic Fiction

Nancy Drew books
2003 American novels
2003 children's books
Novels set on ships
Great Lakes